Sir Trefor Alfred Morris  (born 22 December 1934) was Chief Inspector of Constabulary from 1993 to 1996.

Morris was educated at Ducie Technical High School and the University of Manchester. Morris joined the Manchester City Police in 1955 and by the time of the creation of the Greater Manchester Force was a Chief Superintendent. He was appointed Assistant Chief Constable of that force in 1976.

He transferred to Hertfordshire Constabulary as Deputy Chief Constable in 1979 and served as Chief Constable from 1984 to 1990.

References

1934 births
Living people
People educated at Ducie Technical High School for Boys
Alumni of the University of Manchester
British Chief Constables
English recipients of the Queen's Police Medal
Commanders of the Order of the British Empire
Knights Bachelor
Chief Inspectors of Constabulary (England and Wales)